Anthony Edward López-Carillo (born November 13, 1997) is an American soccer player who currently plays as a forward for the Pittsburgh Riverhounds in the USL Championship.

Career

Youth
López was part of the USSDA side FC Golden State's academy team until 2016. He also attended Sylmar High School.

College and Amateur
In 2016, López attended the University of California, Riverside to play college soccer. In two seasons with the Highlanders, López made 31 appearances, scoring two goals and adding four assists. In 2017, he also appeared for USL PDL side Orange County SC U23.

Professional
After two years in college, López left early to pursue a professional career. He joined Brazilian second division side Rio Claro in 2018, before moving to Germany, where he scored 14 goals in 15 appearances for seventh-tier side 1. FCA Darmstadt. During this time there are reports of López having spells with SV Rot-Weiss Walldorf, Ventura County Fusion and an unnamed club in the United Premier Soccer League. 

Following a successful open tryout in December 2019, López signed with National Independent Soccer Association side California United Strikers. He went on to score ten goals in 42 appearances.

On February 28, 2023, López signed with USL Championship club Pittsburgh Riverhounds prior to their 2023 season.

References

1997 births
Living people
American expatriate soccer players
American expatriate sportspeople in Brazil
American expatriate sportspeople in Germany
American soccer players
Association football forwards
California United Strikers FC players
Expatriate footballers in Brazil
Expatriate footballers in Germany
National Independent Soccer Association players
Orange County SC U-23 players
Pittsburgh Riverhounds SC players
Soccer players from California
UC Riverside Highlanders men's soccer players
USL Championship players
USL League Two players